Fray Pedro Carrera y Lanchares (1760s - c.1815) was a Spanish Carmelite friar, organist and composer. Carrera was pupil of D. Joseph Lidon, organist of the Capilla Real de Madrid, then organist of the Monasterio de las Descalzas Reales (Madrid).

References

1760s births
1810s deaths